The salle Érard is a music venue located in Paris, 13 rue du Mail in the 2nd arrondissement of Paris.

It is part of the hôtel particulier which belonged, from the 18th century, to the  family of piano, harp and harpsichord manufacturers.

Small in size, but well isolated from the noises of the city, enjoying good acoustics, it is more particularly adapted to chamber music.

During the 19th and the beginning of the 20th, it was the place of premières and debuts noted for both compositions and for interpreters, among which:
Érik Satie (orchestrations of his Gymnopédies by Claude Debussy),
Jacques Ibert, les histoires (ten pieces for piano) (1923),
Nellie Melba,
Ricardo Viñes,
Maurice Ravel, Miroirs (1906), Menuet antique (1892), Histoires naturelles with Jane Bathori (1907), Sonate pour violon et piano (1927), Trois poèmes de Mallarmé (1914),
Camille Saint-Saens (1860).,
Ignacy Jan Paderewski (1888),
Claude Debussy,  Triptyque Estampes (1904), Le Promenoir des deux amants (1911),
Alexander Scriabin (1896),
Joseph Jongen,
André Caplet, Conte fantastique with Micheline Kahn as the harpist, (1923)
Vladimir de Pachmann (1882),
Charles Valentin Alkan (1837) and (1880),
Francis Poulenc,
Reynaldo Hahn, pianist Édouard Risler (1908),
Ernest Chausson, Viviane (1883),
César Franck, Le Chasseur maudit (1883),
Arthur Honegger, Le Cahier romand (1924),
Olivier Messiaen, Huit préludes (1930),
Maurice Delage, Sept haï-kaïs (1925),
Quatre poèmes hindous (1914),
Francis Planté,
Stéphan Elmas ou Youra Guller.
Beethoven Sonata No. 29 in Bb Major "Hammerklavier" with Franz Liszt at the piano.

Before the construction of the Maison de la Radio (1963), the hall served as a recording studio for the Radiodiffusion française.

Nowadays, only the salon sees the organization of concerts, the volumes of the proper room having been reconverted (the volume of spaces is suggested by the organization of the roofs as well as the old entrance facade at No. 11 rue Paul Lelong - Paris 02). Nevertheless, it remains prized for its acoustics and its past charged with both musical and artistic history.

Salle Érard in London
The Salle Erard opened its London piano gallery and recital hall on 11 July 1894 on Great Marlborough Street, with a performance by Polish pianist, Ignacy Jan Paderewski. The recital hall could accommodate an audience of 300 people. The stained glass windows featured portraits of Saint-Saëns, Gounod, Liszt, Clara Schumann, Rubinstein, Wagner, Chopin, Sigismond Thalberg and Balfe.

See also 
Société Nationale de Musique

References

External links 
 Salle Érard on YouTube (promotion)
 La Salle Érard a besoin de nous
 La Salle Érard on France Musique
 La Salle Érard, panorama on abcsalles.com

Buildings and structures in the 2nd arrondissement of Paris
Music venues in Paris